La Madelon or Quand Madelon, also known in English as Madelon (I'll Be True to the Whole Regiment) is a French popular song of World War I.  Although it is mostly known as La Madelon the proper title is Quand Madelon which are the beginning words of the refrain.   The lyrics are by Louis Bousquet (1914) and the music by Camille Robert.

The song tells a story about soldiers flirting with a lovely young waitress in a country tavern and may partly owe its long term popularity to the fact that the lyrics were clean at a time when soldiers' songs were mostly bawdy and rude.  It was one of the most popular songs in France during World War I and became a patriotic song as the war wore on.  It remains a patriotic, well-known song in France to this day. It also became popular among Spanish soldiers.

It was revived in World War II and Marlene Dietrich sang it in Paris in 1939 during the celebration of the national day of 14 July.

The 1955 French film La Madelon, directed by Jean Boyer was a comedy based on Madelon's legend starring the great Line Renaud who plays the title character and sings the song surrounded by soldiers.

Spanish actress-singer Sara Montiel sang it in the box office hit movie El Último Cuplé (Juan de Orduña, Spain 1957). The soundtrack album was also an international success.

Lyrics

External links
 archive.org 1918 recording of La Madelon by Amparito Farrar(Accessed 2011-03-08)
 chansons historiques de France: La Madelon 1914 (Accessed 2011-03-08)
 Original lyrics in French(Accessed 2011-03-08)
 Sara Montiel Songbook
 English version sung by Arthur Fields (1918) (Accessed 2019-01-12)

References

French songs
French patriotic songs
Songs of World War I
Year of song missing
French military marches